Hugh Magnus (1007 – 17 September 1025) was co-King of France under his father, Robert II, from 1017 until his death in 1025. He was a  member of the House of Capet, a son of Robert II by his third wife, Constance of Arles.

The first Capetian King of France, Hugh Capet, had ensured his family's succession to the throne by having his son, Robert II, crowned and accepted as King during his own lifetime; father and son had ruled together as King thenceforth until Hugh Capet's death. Robert II, when his son was old enough, determined to do the same. Hugh Magnus was thus crowned King of France on 9/19 June 1017, and thenceforth ruled beside his father. However, when older, he rebelled against Robert.

Hugh died, perhaps of a fall from his horse, at Compiègne in 1025 while preparing a rebellion against his father, aged around 18 years old.

Rodulfus Glaber was fulsome in his praise of the young king, writing: "My pen cannot express all of the great and good qualities that he showed...in all things he was better than the best. No elegy can ever equal his merits."

As a King of France, he would be numbered Hugh II; however, he is rarely referred to as such as he predeceased his father.

References

 The Origins of Some Angelo-Norman Families by Lewis C. Loyd, Page 50.
 The Doomesday Monachorum of Christ Church Canterbury, Page 55-6.

Sources
Heraldica

|-

|-

1007 births
1025 deaths
11th-century kings of France
Hugh
11th-century French people